Hassan Abbas (born 24 January 1974 in Homs, Syria) is a retired professional Syrian football midfielder who last played for Al-Karamah in the Syrian Premier League the top division in Syria.

Abbas's career began in the youth system of Al-Karamah before starting his professional career with the senior team. He has won many trophies in his career including five Syrian Premier League titles, six Syrian Cups, one Super Cup and helped the club reach the final of the AFC Champions League for the first time. Al-Karamah were defeated 3–2 on aggregate in the final by Jeonbuk Hyundai Motors of the K-League. Three years later, he was a key factor in his side's first-ever accession to AFC Cup Final. Al-Karamah were defeated 2–1 in the final of the second most important association cup in Asia by Kuwait SC of the Kuwaiti Premier League.

Abbas began his rise in the international scene at youth level and represented Syria at the 1994 AFC U-19 Championship that Syria won, he also represented Syria at the 1995 FIFA U-20 World Cup. In addition, he competed with the senior team in the 1996 AFC Asian Cup and played again for Syria in the 1998 FIFA World Cup qualification.

References

External links 
 
 

1974 births
Living people
Sportspeople from Homs
Syrian footballers
Association football midfielders
Syria international footballers
Al-Karamah players
1996 AFC Asian Cup players
Syrian Premier League players